Tobi 6 - Coptic Calendar - Tobi 8

The seventh day of the Coptic month of Tobi, the fifth month of the Coptic year. On a common year, this day corresponds to January 2, of the Julian Calendar, and January 15, of the Gregorian Calendar. This day falls in the Coptic season of Peret, the season of emergence.

Commemorations

Saints 

 The departure of Pope Sylvester I, the Patriarch of Rome

References 

Days of the Coptic calendar